Joe Colvey (born January 19, 1948) is a retired Canadian football player who played for the Ottawa Rough Riders, Montreal Alouettes and Calgary Stampeders of the Canadian Football League (CFL). He played college football at Carleton University.

References

1948 births
Living people
Canadian football defensive backs
Carleton Ravens football players
Ottawa Rough Riders players
Montreal Alouettes players
Calgary Stampeders players
Players of Canadian football from Quebec
Canadian football people from Montreal
Anglophone Quebec people